Jessica Pegula and Taylor Townsend were the defending champions, but both players decided not to participate.

Nicole Gibbs and Asia Muhammad won the title after defeating Desirae Krawczyk and Giuliana Olmos 3–6, 6–3, [14–12] in the final.

Seeds

Draw

Draw

References
Main Draw

RBC Pro Challenge - Doubles